Robert Drummond Lamberton is a classics scholar, poet, and translator of ancient and contemporary literature, most notably Maurice Blanchot's Thomas the Obscure. He is currently professor emeritus in the Classics Department at Washington University in St. Louis. Lamberton was born in Providence, Rhode Island and graduated in 1964 from Harvard College magna cum laude with a degree in Romance languages and literature. He has a master's (1970) and a doctoral degree in comparative literature from Yale University (1979), and has taught at Columbia, Princeton, and Cornell universities. He has written eight books.

References
The Record, the weekly newspaper of Washington University
Author at Station Hill Press

Specific

Harvard College alumni
Yale University alumni
Living people
Year of birth missing (living people)
Washington University in St. Louis faculty
Columbia University faculty
Princeton University faculty
Cornell University faculty